Watch Me Dance is the second album by British musician Toddla T. It features collaborations from artists including Shola Ama and Roots Manuva. Two singles were released from the album, "Take It Back" featuring Shola Ama and "Watch Me Dance" featuring Roots Manuva.

Leak
The album was leaked in July 2011, probably by a German magazine which had had advance access to it. Ninja Tune stated that this would "seriously affect the ability to make any kind of financial return" from the album.

Track listing

References

External links

2011 albums
Toddla T albums
Ninja Tune albums